Joakim Nyström was the champion of the event when it last took place, in 1986. He did not participate in 1990.Ivan Lendl won the title, defeating Tim Mayotte 6–3, 6–0, in the final.

Seeds
The top eight seeds receive a bye into the second round.

Draw

Finals

Top half

Section 1

Section 2

Bottom half

Section 3

Section 4

References
General

1990 ATP Tour
1990